Ludowyk, or Caspar Smits, or Smith or Gaspar Smitz (1635 in Zwartewaal – 1707 in Dublin), was a Dutch Golden Age painter.

Biography
According to Houbraken he was called Ludowyk Smits, nicknamed Hartkamp, and was the teacher of the painters Simon Germyn and Garret Morphy. Smits came to live in Dordrecht for a few years with the organist Joan Kools, whose wife traded in paintings, when he was 40 in 1675.  He started by making "penitent Maria Magdalenes", but made his living primarily by painting fruit and flower still lifes in the manner of Jan Davidsz de Heem and Willem van Aelst.  He used cheap paint that faded quickly, and when his customers complained he said that the paint lasted longer than the money that was paid for them.

According to the RKD he was known under the names Lodewyk, Gaspar, and Magdalen Smits, as well as the alias Theodorus Hartkamp. Abraham Bredius found Dordrechtse documents in the archives there to prove that Houbraken's Ludowyk Smits and Horace Walpole's Gaspar Smits were the same person  He was a member of the Guild of St. Luke in Dublin from 1681 to 1688, and according to Walpole he was active in Ireland until his death in 1707.

References

 
 A Dictionary of painters, sculptors, architects, and engravers, page 328 (lists Magdalen Smith and Ludowick Smith side by side), by John Gould, Horace Walpole, and George Vertue, London, 1810, on Google books
 Theodorus Smits in the RKD (listed with alias Casparus Smits and states he was a member of the Antwerp guild as a follower of Jan Davidsz. de Heem) 
Gaspar Smits/Smith/Smitz and Theodorus (Dirk) Smits on Artnet

1635 births
1707 deaths
Dutch Golden Age painters
Dutch male painters
People from Brielle
Painters from Antwerp
Painters from Dublin (city)